The Kharboni tribe is one of the three major sub-tribes of the Khogyani tribe of Karlan Pashtun. The Kharboni are primarily found in the central regions of Nangarhar Province, Afghanistan, particularly Khogyani District. kharboni Afghan

References

Pashtun tribes
Ethnic groups in Afghanistan